Elitloppet (literally: "The Elite Race") or Solvallas Internationella Elitlopp  is an annual, invitational Group One harness event that has taken place at Solvalla Racetrack in Stockholm, Sweden, since 1952. The competition is regarded as one of the most prestigious international events in trotting. The winner is decided through two qualifying rounds and a subsequent final later the same day. Both the eliminations and the final are raced over the mile. The overall purse for the 2022 event was SEK11,350,000, equalling approximately US$1,073,000. In 2002 the Italian champion Varenne, (considered the strongest trotter of all time), took it in a world record time of 1:10.4 in the elimination and then bested that mark by winning the final in 1:10.2 – the fastest mile ever trotted around three turns. The fastest winning time in a final is 1:08.9, run by the Swedish Don Fanucci Zet in 2021. Elitloppet was part of the European Grand Circuit and is part of that circuit's successor, the UET Masters Series.

History

The beginning
The first Elitloppet was run in 1952 under the name of Solvallas Jubileumslopp (approximately "Solvalla's Jubilee Race"). Winner the opening year was the German horse Permit. The following year, the event changed name to Elitloppet.

The doping affair in 2006
In Elitloppet 2006, French star trotter Jag de Bellouet won in a record time of 1:09,4 (km rate), with Italian Lets Go in second place. At a press conference a few weeks after the Elitloppet Day, it was announced that both horses had been disqualified due to positive doping tests. Jag de Bellouet and Lets Go tested positive for diclofenac and etacrynic acid, respectively. After the disqualifications, Swedish Conny Nobell was announced the official winner of the 2006 event. The general secretary in the Swedish Trotting Association (STC), Ulf Hörnberg, expressed that the double disqualifications was a "tragedy" for the event.

The Propulsion scandal
Propulsion is a stallion that was imported from the United States 2015 to race in Sweden for trainer Daniel Redén. The USTA (United States Trotting Association) sent an export certificate to Svensk Travsport (The swedish trotting association). Prior to being imported Propulsion had been nerved and according to Swedish regulations no nerved horse is allowed to race or participate in breeding. It was indicated in the export certificate that the horse was nerved but this was never spotted by Svensk Travsport. The horse was allowed to race and won over 30 million SEK in prize money. In 2020 the horse had never won Elitloppet and participated for the fifth time. In the elimination heat he finished third. Due to his trip in the race his performance was considered very impressive. In the final, Propulsion crossed the finish line first. Two days after Propulsion's victory the Norwegian magazine Trav-og Galopp-nytt published an article claiming to have evidence that Propulsion was nerved and Svensk Travsport opened an investigation into the matter. On 29 October 2020 Svensk Travsport announced that Propulsion was racing in violation of the rules and he was thus stripped of all his results in Sweden. No decision has been made concerning Propulsion's results in other European countries. The matter has now been handed over to STAD (Svenskt Travsports Ansvars-och Disciplinnämnd, literally "Liability and Disciplinary committee of Svensk Travsport") to determine if any sanctions should be handed out. The lawyer of Svensk Travsport, Göran Wahlman said that Daniel Redén did not intentionally violate the rules but, as the trainer, he is strictly liable.

Racing conditions

The races
In 1952–1958 and in 1973, Elitloppet was decided through two heats followed by a race-off if not one and the same horse won both heats. In 1959-1961, when a longer distance was trotted, only a single race was run. Since 1962 (with the exception of 1973), a concept of two eliminations and one final has been used. The number of horses in the eliminations has varied from seven to twelve during these years, but there have always been eight trotters in the final.

Distance
The distance has, with the exception of the years 1959-1961, been in the interval of 1,580–1,640 meters. In 1959, the horses ran 3,200 meters, and the two following years, the distance was approximately 2,700 meters.

Starting method
During the first ten years, 1952–1961, volt start was used in Elitloppet. From 1962 and on, a motorized starting gate has been used, changing the starting method from volt start to auto start.

The Elitloppet weekend
Elitloppet is traditionally raced on the last Sunday of May. Solvalla stages races both Saturday and Sunday which makes up a meet, known in Sweden as "The Elitloppet weekend" (Swedish: Elitloppshelgen). The two days are generally well-visited and is considered one of Sweden's biggest sports events. In 2008, a total of over 53,000 people attended the events at Solvalla.

Past winners

Horses with most wins
 2 - Timoko (2014, 2017)
 2 - Varenne (2001, 2002)
 2 - Copiad (1994, 1995)
 2 - Mack Lobell (1988, 1990)
 2 - Ideal du Gazeau (1980, 1982)
 2 - Timothy T. (1974, 1975)
 2 - Eileen Eden (1968, 1970)
 2 - Roquepine (1966, 1967)
 2 - Gelinotte (1956, 1957)

Sires with at least two winning offspring
 2 - Quick Pay (The Onion, Victory Tilly)
 2 - Andover Hall (Nuncio, Magic Tonight)
 2 - Alf Palema (Gidde Palema, Torvald Palema)
 2 - Bulwark (Frances Bulwark, Carné)
 2 - Epilog (Eidelstedter, Permit)
 2 - Hoot Mon (Pack Hanover, Dart Hanover)
 2 - Kerjacques (Eleazar, Jorky)
 2 - Speedy Crown (Gum Ball, Moni Maker)

Drivers with most wins
 6 - Stig H. Johansson (1984, 1987, 1989, 1991, 1997, 2000) 
 4 - Johannes Frömming (1962, 1965, 1968, 1970)
 4 - Örjan Kihlström (2003,2015,2016,2021)
 3 - Leopold Verroken (1976, 1977, 1981)
 3 - Björn Goop (2006,2014,2017)

Countries, number of wins
 25 – 
 23 – 
 10 – 
 5 –  combined with West Germany
 3 – 
 2 – 
 2 –

Fastest winners

Short distance (1,600-1,609 m), auto start (1962-)
 1:08.9 (km rate) - Don Fanucci Zet (2021)

Short distance (1,580-1,640 m), volt start (1952-1958)
 1:16.7 (km rate) - Gelinotte (1956)

Long distance (2,700-3,200 m), volt start (1959-1961)
 1:19.1 (km rate) - Honoré II (1960)

All winners of Elitloppet

1 Nationality of the winning horse's owner(s)

See also
 Harness racing in Sweden
 List of Scandinavian harness horse races

References

External links

 elitloppet.se - official website
 Kurt Anderssons Travsida - list with full results

Harness races in Sweden
1952 establishments in Sweden
May sporting events
Recurring sporting events established in 1952